Henri Brégi (4 December 1888 – 12 January 1917) was a French pioneer aviator. He was the first person to fly an aeroplane in Argentina.

Argentinian flights
Brégi was invited by Jorge Newbery to come to Argentina to make the first flight in that country as part of the centenary celebrations of Argentine Independence. On 6 February 1910, Brégi piloted the first aeroplane flight in Argentina. He had sailed on the steamship Parana from France, arriving on 8 Jan 1910. He brought with him two aeroplanes: both Voisin Biplanes, one with an ENV 60 hp engine and the other with a 50 hp air cooled rotary Gnôme (Octavie III).

Wartime service and death
Henri Brégi was mobilized during the First World War. A pilot of the French Army, he was seconded to the Toulon Maritime Aviation Centre. On 12 January 1917, he volunteered to neutralize a German submarine operating off the harbour. A ditching in the bay of Saint-Mandrier-sur-Mer during the mission overturned the seaplane that Brégi was piloting; he drowned.

References

French aviators
1888 births
1917 deaths
French World War I pilots
French military personnel killed in World War I